The Unitarian Candidacy of Workers (Spanish: Candidatura Unitaria de Trabajadores, CUT) is a libertarian communist and Andalusian nationalist party in Andalusia, Spain. Founded in 1979 with the name Collective for the Unity of Workers – Andalusian Left Bloc (Colectivo de Unidad de los Trabajadores-Bloque Andaluz de Izquierdas, CUT-BAI), it forms part of the coalition United Left, which contains left-wing Spanish parties supporting the country's withdrawal from NATO. CUT current leader is Juan Manuel Sánchez Gordillo, mayor of Marinaleda, Seville.

History
In the IV Congress of the CUT-BAI, held in January 2014 in Seville, the party decided to rename itself, adopting the name Candidatura Unitaria de Trabajadores (Unitarian Candidacy of Workers).

On February 12, 2015, the CUT decided to abandon United Left because of their disagreement with the 'politicy of pacts' between this formation and PSOE. Although they also decided not to join any other party or coalition, the CUT asked to vote for Podemos, and participated in the lists of this party. Two candidates of the CUT were elected in the Parliament of Andalusia, María García and Libertad Benitez. In the 2016 Spanish general election, CUT entered the Spanish Cortes Generales for the first time, as the party vice-leader and former mayor of El Coronil, Seville, Diego Cañamero, was elected as a deputy for the Jaén district running on the Unidos Podemos candidacy. In the 2018 Andalusian regional election, only María García ran for re-election  holding her Parliament seat of Seville.

References

Andalusian nationalist parties
Communist parties in Spain
Far-left politics in Spain
Political parties established in 1979
Political parties in Andalusia
Anarchist political parties
Libertarian socialist parties
Anarcho-communism
Podemos (Spanish political party)
Left-wing nationalist parties